is a railway station of the Chitose Line located in Atsubetsu-ku, Sapporo, Hokkaidō, Japan, operated by Hokkaido Railway Company (JR Hokkaido). The station is numbered H06.

Lines

Surrounding area
 Japan National Route 274, (to Shibecha)
 Sapporo Snow Brand Seed, Horticultural Center
 Sapporo Boeun Gakuen, Social Welfare Corporation

Railway stations in Japan opened in 1926
Railway stations in Sapporo